Moraleja de Matacabras is a municipality located in the province of Ávila within the autonomous community Castile and León, Spain. According to the 2004 census (INE), the municipality has a population of 66 inhabitants.

References

Municipalities in the Province of Ávila
Towns in Spain